The Sesarmidae are a family of crabs, previously included in the Grapsidae by many authors. Several species, namely in Geosesarma, Metopaulias, and Sesarma, are true terrestrial crabs. They do not need to return to the sea even for breeding.

Genera
The family contains these genera:

Aratus 
Armases 
Bresedium 
Chiromantes 
Clistocoeloma 
Contusarma 
Cristarma 
Danarma 
Episesarma 
Fasciarma 
Geosesarma 
Guinearma 
Haberma 
Karstarma 
Labuanium 
Leptarma 
Manarma 
Metagrapsus 
Metasesarma 
Metopaulias 
Miersarma 
Migmarma 
Muradium 
Namlacium 
Nanosesarma 
Neosarmatium
Neosesarma 
Orisarma 
Parasesarma 
Perisesarma 
Platychirarma 
Pseudosesarma 
Sarmatium 
Scandarma 
Selatium 
Sesarma 
Sesarmoides 
Sesarmops 
Stelgistra 
Tiomanum 
Trapezarma

Selected species
Chiromantes dehaani – kurobenkeigani (Japanese)
Chiromantes eulimene – marsh crab (east coast of southern Africa)
Chiromantes haematocheir – red-clawed crab; akategani (Japanese) dodukge (Korean)
Parasesarma erythrodactyla – red-handed shore crab
Parasesarma pictum – kakubenkeigani (Japanese)

References

Grapsoidea
Decapod families